Peter C. Theisinger (born 1945 in Fresno, California) is the director of the Engineering and Science Directorate at the Jet Propulsion Laboratory in Pasadena, California and was the project manager of NASA's Mars Exploration Rover Mission and later project manager for the 2011 Mars Science Laboratory mission.

Theisinger graduated from the California Institute of Technology in 1967 with a bachelor's degree in physics. He joined NASA's Jet Propulsion Laboratory (JPL) as payload integration engineer that year and except for a three-year span in the early 1980s has worked at JPL since. Among the missions on which he has participated were the 1967 Mariner 5 flyby mission to Venus, the 1971 Mariner 9 orbiter mission to Mars, the Voyager mission to the outer planets of the Solar System, the Galileo mission to Jupiter, and the Mars Global Surveyor orbiter.

In 2013, Theisinger, along with Richard Cook, was named one of Time magazine's 100 Most Influential People in the World
as a pioneer for his role in getting the Curiosity rover to Mars safely in August 2012.

References

External links

 NASA Biography
 JPL Biography

NASA people
Mars Exploration Rover mission
California Institute of Technology alumni
1945 births
Living people